Olle Eksell (born Carl Olof Lennart in Ål, Sweden; March 22, 1918 – April 11, 2007) was a Swedish graphic designer and poster artist, and a professor until 2001. He was married to artist Ruthel Günzberger. He gave shape to the classic "eyes" on chocolate packages for Ögon Cacao, and wrote the book Design = Economy.

References

1918 births
2007 deaths
Swedish graphic designers